Pół Orła is a Polish coat of arms. It was used by several noble families in the times of the Polish–Lithuanian Commonwealth.

History

Blazon

Notable bearers
Notable bearers of this coat of arms include:
 Jan Paczko

Sources
Tadeusz Gajl: Herbarz polski od średniowiecza do XX wieku : ponad 4500 herbów szlacheckich 37 tysięcy nazwisk 55 tysięcy rodów. L&L, 2007, s. 279. .
Andrzej Brzezina Winiarski: Herby Rzeczypospolitej. Przemyśl: 2008.

See also
Polish heraldry
Heraldry
Coat of arms

Poronia